Ordinary Things may refer to:

 Ordinary Things: Poems from a Walk in Early Spring, a 1997 book of poems by Ralph Fletcher
 "Ordinary Things" (song), by Lukas Graham, 2011
 "Ordinary Things", a song by Plexi from Cheer Up
 "The Ordinary Things", a song from the musical Through a Glass, Darkly